Tonga sent a delegation to compete at the 2004 Summer Paralympics in Athens, Greece. The country was represented by a single athlete, Alailupe Valeti (also referred to as Alailupe Tualau), who competed in a shot put event for visually impaired athletes.

Athletics

See also
Tonga at the Paralympics
Tonga at the 2004 Summer Olympics

References 

Nations at the 2004 Summer Paralympics
2004
Summer Paralympics